Enzo Martínez may refer to:

 Enzo Martínez (footballer, born 1990), Uruguayan midfielder playing in the United States
 Enzo Martínez (footballer, born 1996), Argentine midfielder
 Enzo Martínez (footballer, born 1998), Uruguayan defender
 Enzo Martínez (swimmer) (born 1994), Uruguayan swimmer